Ștefan de la Bărbulești (Ștefan from Bărbulești) born on 25 December 1959 is a Romani lăutar and manele singer, best known internationally as the artist of the song "Eu Vin Acasă Cu Drag". This song, however, is more recognized as the "Borat Television Programme" theme as shown on Channel 4, as part of the Ali G series starring Sacha Baron Cohen. He is also well-known for "Manele la rece", where people pay him thousands to sing according to their life's events. He is well known in Țăndărei and Milmoi for his singing tributes.

The song is included on the official soundtrack to Cohen's 2006 movie, which featured him as his famous character Borat.

His son, Narcis, is also a manele singer.

External links
  "Top Story: Chef de chef la botezul fiicei lui Ștefan de la Bărbulești", ProTV, 8 June 2007

Year of birth missing (living people)
Living people
Place of birth missing (living people)
Romani musicians
Romanian Romani people
Romanian male singers
Romanian manele singers
Lăutari and lăutărească music